The Truth About Mother Goose is an animated film released on August 28, 1957, by Walt Disney Productions.  The short was directed by Wolfgang Reitherman in his directorial debut, and Bill Justice, and written by Bill Peet.

Plot
In this short, a trio of jazz-singing jesters sing three Mother Goose nursery rhymes, while an off screen narrator explains their origins in three animated vignettes. The rhymes include:

"Little Jack Horner": Thomas Horner (steward to Richard Whiting, the last abbot of Glastonbury), allegedly stealing a title deed in transit to Henry VIII of England.
"Mary, Mary, Quite Contrary": The life of Mary Stuart.  The segment claims that the "silver bells" are said to "refer to the elaborate decoration on her dresses", the "cockle shells" to her love of exotic food such as cockles, with the "pretty maids all in a row" referring to her ladies-in-waiting.
"London Bridge Is Falling Down": The gradual deterioration and dilapidation of the medieval Old London Bridge.

Academy Awards
It was nominated for the Academy Award for Best Animated Short Film in 1957.

Home media
The short was released on December 6, 2005, on Walt Disney Treasures: Disney Rarities - Celebrated Shorts: 1920s–1960s.

References

External links
 
 The Truth About Mother Goose Disney shorts (Internet Archive)

1950s educational films
1957 films
1950s Disney animated short films
Disney educational films
1957 animated films
Films directed by Bill Justice
Films produced by Walt Disney
Films set in Tudor England
Short films directed by Wolfgang Reitherman
Films based on nursery rhymes
Films scored by George Bruns
Works based on nursery rhymes
1957 directorial debut films
1950s English-language films
1950s American films